The Byzantine Church is a ruined church in Lin, Korçë County, Albania. It is a Cultural Monument of Albania. The church has been included within the possible UNESCO site of the Natural and Cultural Heritage of the Ohrid Region (Albania).

The church was built during the 6th century AD, in the Justinian era.

References

Cultural Monuments of Albania
Buildings and structures in Pogradec
Church ruins in Albania
6th-century churches
Churches in Korçë County
Lin, Korçë
Byzantine church buildings in Albania